Wings at the Speed of Sound is the fifth studio album by the British–American rock band Wings, released on 25 March 1976. Issued at the height of the band's popularity, it reached the top spot on the US album chart—the band's fourth consecutive album to do so—and peaked at number 2 on the UK album chart. Both singles from the album also reached the top 5 of the UK and US singles charts, with "Silly Love Songs" reaching number 1 in the US.

The album was recorded and released in the midst of Wings' highly successful Wings Over the World tour, with songs from the album performed on the tour after its release. Subsequently, performances of "Let 'Em In", "Time to Hide", 'Silly Love Songs' and "Beware My Love" were included on the live album Wings over America, released in December 1976.

As a reaction to critics who believed Wings was merely a vehicle for Paul McCartney, the album featured every member of the band taking lead vocals on at least one song, and two songs from the album are written or co-written by band members other than the McCartneys.

History 
After a series of concerts in Australia in November 1975, Wings took a break from the tour to spend the holidays with their families and in January 1976 booked time at Abbey Road Studios in London to record Wings at the Speed of Sound. It was the first time McCartney had fully recorded an album in England since Red Rose Speedway. Because of the tour commitments, Wings were not afforded the opportunity to record in another locale. By the end of February, the album was complete, and Wings went back on the road.

Around the time of the studio sessions for Wings at the Speed of Sound, Wings were facing criticism for being merely a vehicle for McCartney. He encouraged each of the band members to contribute a song during the sessions. McCartney had previously attempted to create a democratic album in Red Rose Speedway, though it would be rejected by his record label.

Engineer Peter Henderson later commented, "I remember one of my first engineering jobs, working with Paul McCartney on Wings at the Speed of Sound — he'd do two vocal takes and ask, 'Which is the better one?' And when he played guitar, he'd really lean into it and give it everything he got."
Two tracks ("The Note You Never Wrote" and "Warm and Beautiful") were arranged by Fiachra Trench.

Recording 
The album was recorded at Abbey Road in two different periods of sessions: first sessions took place in August/September and October 1975, with work resuming in January–February 1976. During the playback of "Must Do Something About It", Paul heard drummer Joe English sing the song and decided to have him take the lead vocal. In "Cook of the House", McCartney handled double-bass, while "Silly Love Songs" was arranged in a disco-style, in a similar fashion to Al Green's "Sha La La".

Release and reception

Wings at the Speed of Sound was released in late March 1976 to lukewarm critical reviews. Rolling Stones reviewer described it as a "Day with the McCartneys" concept album. The introduction, "Let 'Em In" was perceived as an invitation to join the McCartneys on this fantasy day, with explanation of their philosophy ("Silly Love Songs"), a lunch break ("Cook of the House"), and a chance to get to know McCartney's friends (Denny Laine in "The Note You Never Wrote", Jimmy McCulloch in "Wino Junko", etc.).

The album reached number 2 in the United Kingdom (and was the 4th best-selling album of 1976). It became McCartney's most successful American chart album since his days in The Beatles, spending seven nonconsecutive weeks at number 1 throughout the summer (and blocking the new Beatles compilation Rock 'n' Roll Music, which reached number 2). Wings at the Speed of Sound sold 3.5 million copies worldwide.

Much of the album's success can be attributed to its two smash singles. "Silly Love Songs", a response to his critics and one of McCartney's biggest hits, followed the album in April, and became one of 1976's biggest-selling singles. This was followed in July with "Let 'Em In", which also scaled the singles charts. Amid all this, Wings finally went to North America for the Wings Over America Tour, playing McCartney's first shows there in ten years (after the Beatles' final tour of America in 1966) to euphoric reaction; four selections from Speed of Sound were included in the tour setlist.

Denny Laine covered "Time to Hide" and "The Note You Never Wrote" in 1996 on his album Denny Laine Performs the Hits of Wings.

Further releases
In 1993, Wings at the Speed of Sound was remastered and reissued on compact disc as part of The Paul McCartney Collection series; "Walking in the Park with Eloise", which had been released under the name the Country Hams, its B-side "Bridge on the River Suite", and the Wings track "Sally G" (the B-side to their single "Junior's Farm") were added as bonus tracks. All were recorded in Nashville in 1974.

Track listing

Archive Collection Reissue
On 23 September 2014 the album was re-issued by Hear Music/Concord Music Group as part of the fifth set of releases, alongside Venus and Mars, in the Paul McCartney Archive Collection. It was released in multiple formats:

Standard Edition: 2-CD; the original 11-track album on the first disc, plus 7 bonus tracks on the second disc.
Deluxe Edition: 2-CD/1-DVD; the original 11-track album, the 7 bonus tracks disc, and a hardback book featuring unpublished photographs, new interviews with Paul, material from Paul's archives and expanded track-by-track information. The deluxe version bonus DVD comprises filmed material from around the time of the album release, some of which has never been seen before. The DVD features rare and previously unseen footage, including the documentaries "Wings over Wembley", "Wings in Venice" and the "Silly Love Songs" music video.
Remastered vinyl: The album is available on a special gatefold vinyl edition (the vinyl edition includes a download card).
High resolution: Digital album is available as both standard and deluxe versions – including Mastered for iTunes and in high resolution.

Disc two – bonus audio

 "Silly Love Songs"  – 2:44
 "She's My Baby"  – 3:46
 "Message to Joe" – 0:24
 "Beware My Love"  – 5:35
 "Must Do Something About It"  – 3:37
 "Let 'Em In"  – 4:18
 "Warm and Beautiful"  – 1:27

Disc three – DVD

 "Silly Love Songs"  – 5:45
 "Wings Over Wembley" – 13:22
 "Wings in Venice" – 3:10

Personnel 
 Paul McCartney – vocals, bass/acoustic/electric guitars, keyboards, double bass
 Linda McCartney – vocals, keyboards
 Denny Laine – vocals, acoustic/electric/bass guitars, piano, harmonica
 Jimmy McCulloch – vocals, acoustic/electric/bass guitars
 Joe English – vocals, drums, percussion

Additional musicians
 Tony Dorsey – trombone
 Thaddeus Richard – saxophone, clarinet, flute
 Steve Howard – trumpet, flugelhorn
 Howie Casey – saxophone
 George Tidwell – trumpet
 uncredited session musicians – orchestrations

Charts

Weekly charts

Year-end charts

Certifications and Sales

References

External links

Paul McCartney and Wings albums
1976 albums
Albums with cover art by Hipgnosis
Albums produced by Paul McCartney
Capitol Records albums
Columbia Records albums
Parlophone albums